Lampayo is a genus of flowering plants belonging to the family Verbenaceae.

Its native range is Bolivia to Northwestern Argentina.

Species:

Lampayo castellani 
Lampayo hieronymi 
Lampayo officinalis

References

Verbenaceae
Verbenaceae genera